John, Margrave of Brandenburg may refer to:
John II, Elector of Brandenburg (1455–1499), Prince-elector of the Margraviate of Brandenburg 
John, Margrave of Brandenburg-Kulmbach (1406–1464), Margrave of Brandenburg-Kulmbach, nicknamed 'The Alchemist'